John Thorley (fl. 1397) of Lincoln was an English politician.

He was a Member (MP) of the Parliament of England for Lincoln in September 1397.

References

14th-century births
Year of death missing
English MPs September 1397
People from Lincoln, England